The Techtonic Velodrome is a 250-meter, multi-purpose indoor velodrome located in Bellville, South Africa. The venue has served as Greater Cape Town's main concert venue and has now been replaced by the Cape Town Stadium. Its maximum capacity for cycling competition would range from 5 to 8,000.

Construction
The velodrome was initially developed for the South African Olympic Bid, this venue hosted the World Cycling Federation Championships in 1999. The project was completed in 9 months from inception.

The Velodrome features an acoustically treated soffit lining for purposes of hosting music and other entertainment events. The Velodrome was designed as a phased development with seating capacity on completion of up to 6,000 seats (existing seats currently are 2,500 and Event Organiser can provide the balance to bring it up to 6,000 seats) or standing capacity is 7,800. Phase 1 is complete and various designs exist as well as development proposals for the surrounding property to support the functions of the Velodrome.

Events
On September 5, 2007, WWE's RAW SummerSlam Tour took place with over 7,000 fans in attendance.

The velodrome hosted the 2007 UCI "B" World Championship in June 2007.

It was also the venue for the 2008 UCI Junior World Championships, which was awarded to the city of Cape Town.

It was also the home of the Organised Chaos LAN Party, South Africa's biggest monthly gaming event. Organised Chaos moved to a different venue after the commencing of The Galleria Development early in 2012, but still make use of the Bellville Velodrome for large events from time to time.

The Galleria Development
At a Council meeting on 28 October 2009, approval was given for the City of Cape Town to award a R3 billion tender to establish retail, business, residential, hotel and conference facilities on an 11.5 ha property in the Bellville Velodrome precinct.

The tender was won by Devmet Property Developments, a consortium of Devmark Property Group (Pty) Limited and Mettle Property Group (Pty) Limited, through a competitive bidding process that lasted more than two years. Mettle Property Group is 49% owned by Metropolitan Capital, an associated company of the Metropolitan Group, and is a level eight contributor in terms of Broad Based Black Economic Empowerment (BBBEE).

The development is based on a spine ‘Galleria’ that will provide the circulation and connection to all the facilities.  Parking with entrances at various levels and locations will be provided to connect the hotel, conference and sporting facilities with the retail, business and residential components.

Devmet Property Developments has put together a group of companies and management models that offer a suitable range of skills and experience in property development, property management, financial oversight, facilities management and events management. They incorporate and provide local and international experience, strategic partnerships and networks, and innovative technologies, designs and processes.  The group includes Devmet, Big Concerts, the High Performance Sports Centre and several smaller, specialist firms,” Gelderbloem added.

The overall capacity of the venue will be increased to 18,000 with the upgrade to the velodrome and adjoining athletics venue considered as part of Phase 1.

It was initially envisaged that the development will be completed by 2014, however, as of November 2013, no construction work has taken place. There was some concern as to the developments effect on the surrounding suburbs as a road will need to be built through local suburbs and parks, but after public hearings the plan to build a road was withdrawn.

Concerts

 Jay-Z
 Rihanna
 Toto
 Jimmy Eat World
 50 Cent
 P!nk
 The Offspring
 Counting Crows
 Bryan Adams
 The Cranberries
 Faithless
 The Prodigy
 LIVE
 Alanis Morissette
 Avril Lavigne
 Lil Wayne
 David Gray
 Billy Joel
 Mary J Blige
 Kanye West
 Groove Armada
 R.E.M.
 Sting
 Roger Waters
 Armin Van Buuren
 Westlife
 Ronan Keating
 Simply Red
 Bruce Springsteen
 Metallica
 Sixto Rodriguez

References

External links
TrackCyclingSA.co.za - photo and description
Bellville Velodrome on Bellville Guide
Organised Chaos - South Africa's biggest monthly gaming event

Velodromes in South Africa
Sports venues in Cape Town
Cycle racing in South Africa
Sports venues completed in 1997
Netball venues in South Africa